Geirr is a given name. Notable people with the name include:

Geirr Lystrup (born 1949), Norwegian singer, poet, playwright, and children's writer
Geirr Tveitt (1908–1981), Norwegian composer and pianist

See also
Geir